La Meauffe is a commune in the Manche department in Normandy in north-western France.

History

The 11 and 12 July 1944, the village was attacked by the American 35th ID, while defended by the German 352 ID and units of the 266 ID. The fighting, violent, started the 11th and ended the 12th, cost the lives of 19 US soldiers, wounding 170, with 25 missing. The road D54, leading to La Meauffe was renamed the Death Valley Road by the US soldiers.

Heraldry

See also
Communes of the Manche department

References

Meauffe